Spongiidae is a family of sea sponges in the order Dictyoceratida.

Genera
Coscinoderma Carter, 1883
Evenor Duchassaing & Michelotti, 1864
Hippospongia Schulze, 1879
 Lendenfeld, 1888
Leiosella Lendenfeld, 1888
Rhopaloeides Thompson, Murphy, Bergquist & Evans, 1987
Spongia Linnaeus, 1759

References

 
Dictyoceratida
Sponge families